Journal of Geriatric Psychiatry and Neurology is a bimonthly peer-reviewed medical journal covering the fields of psychiatry and neurology in geriatric settings. The journal editor-in-chief is James M. Ellison (Thomas Jefferson University). It was established in 1988 and is published by SAGE Publications.

Abstracting and indexing
The journal is abstracted and indexed in:

According to the Journal Citation Reports, the journal has a 2016 impact factor of 2.109.

References

External links

SAGE Publishing academic journals
English-language journals
Bimonthly journals
Publications established in 1988
Gerontology journals
Psychiatry journals
Neurology journals